Duel at Diablo is a 1966 American Western film starring James Garner in his first Western after leaving the long-running tv series Maverick,  as well as Sidney Poitier in his first ever Western. Based on Marvin H. Albert's 1957 novel Apache Rising, the film was co-written by Albert and Michael M. Grilikhes; it was directed by Ralph Nelson, who had directed Poitier in Lilies of the Field. The supporting cast includes Bibi Andersson, Bill Travers, Dennis Weaver and John Hoyt; Ralph Nelson has a cameo as an Army Major. The movie was shot on location amidst striking scenery in southern Utah; the musical score was composed by Neal Hefti.

Plot
A frontier scout, Jess Remsberg (James Garner), is searching for the murderer of his Comanche wife. He carries her scalp with him as a reminder of his vengeance. All he knows is that it was done by a white man. While crossing the desert he rescues Ellen Grange (Bibi Andersson) from a pursuing band of Apaches, and returns her to her businessman husband, Willard Grange (Dennis Weaver). The couple has lived apart for most of the previous two years, since Ellen Grange was kidnapped by Apaches. She had been rescued, but then voluntarily returned to the Apaches to live with the son of the chief.

Jess learns from his friend, Lt. "Scotty" McAllister  (Bill Travers), an experienced and ambitious army lieutenant (promoted from a sergeant) anxious for further promotion, that the town marshal at Fort Concho has information about Jess's murdered wife. Jess informs Scotty that he saw the dead tortured body of his scout.

Jess agrees to act as a cavalry scout to replace Scotty's scout. Scotty has to lead an Army cavalry unit of twenty-five inexperienced soldiers taking horses, ammunition and supplies to Fort Concho. Willard and Ellen are joining them, as is horse breaker Toller (Sidney Poitier), a veteran of the 10th Cavalry (the "Buffalo Soldiers"). Toller has been contracted to provide horses to the army and will accompany the party, breaking horses on the way.

The townsfolk treated Ellen Grange as an outcast after her first abduction, and are now even worse. Some men try to rape her, but she is rescued by Jess, aided by Toller. The two had previously had a confrontation in a bar, which, with McAllister's intervention, was resolved without ill feeling. On the morning the supply wagon is to set out it is learned she has again returned voluntarily to the Apaches. Her husband does nothing about it, but Jess goes after her. While rescuing her he discovers she has had a child by the now-dead son of the Apache chief, Chata (based on Chato) (John Hoyt). Jess rides off with mother and child to catch up with the expedition.

The supply wagons, however, have been ambushed by Chata and his warriors, with serious losses of men, food and water. McAllister is seriously wounded, but is able to function. The men also look to Toller for leadership. Using the infant as a shield (he is Chata’s grandson), Jess and Ellen get through the Apache attackers encircling the besieged cavalry force.

McAllister devises a plan to break out of their position and take refuge in Diablo Canyon, where there is water and better cover. As part of the plan Jess is to speed to Fort Concho for help. That done, he can resume the search for his wife’s killer.

The plan succeeds. The besieged unit is able to break out and hole up in the canyon, and Jess, though his horse dies and he is parched from thirst, is able to kill his pursuers and get to the fort. Reinforcements are immediately sent to the canyon, where the unit is under constant attack and the defenders are being killed by attrition. Willard Grange is captured by the Apaches and is tied upside down over an open flame overnight so that his cries of agony will prevent the others from resting.

At the fort Jess learns that the man he has been hunting for is none other than Willard Grange, who had been out for revenge for what had been done to his wife. Jess races to the canyon, arriving with the army reinforcements just in time to save the last four survivors, including Toller, Ellen Grange and Troopers Nyles and Casey. Jess searches for Willard and finds him barely alive. Willard begs Jess to take pity on him and put him out of his misery, so Jess gives him his pistol and leaves. Moments later a single shot is heard.

The Apaches are disarmed and rounded up to be returned to the reservation. Chata is allowed a final embrace of his grandson before joining them. As the detachment moves out, Toller stands by the graves of the dead soldiers, including McAllister.

Cast

Production
Parts of the film were shot in Paria, Kanab Canyon, Tom's Canyon, Glen Canyon, Vermilion Cliffs, White Cliffs, and Kaibab National Forest in Utah.

Critical response
Writing in The New York Times, Robert Alden gave a positive review, stating that "Much of it is raw and ugly, yet it is a film that will grip you, a film that will have a shattering effect by the time you go back out into the street." A more critical, three-star review was written by Tony Sloman for the Radio Times, observing that "it doesn't quite succeed, partly because the eclectic casting (including Swede Bibi Andersson and Brit Bill Travers) gets in the way of the authenticity."

See also
 List of American films of 1966

References

External links
 
 
 
 
 

1966 films
1966 Western (genre) films
1960s English-language films
American Western (genre) films
Western (genre) cavalry films
Apache Wars films
Films directed by Ralph Nelson
United Artists films
Films based on American novels
Films based on Western (genre) novels
Films scored by Neal Hefti
Films shot in Utah
1960s American films